Reynoldsville is an unincorporated community in Harrison County, West Virginia, United States. Reynoldsville has a post office with ZIP code 26422.

The community was named after Thomas Philip Reynolds, an early settler.

References

Unincorporated communities in Harrison County, West Virginia
Unincorporated communities in West Virginia
Coal towns in West Virginia